Veronica Elaine Nunn (born October 7, 1957) is an American jazz singer who has been the featured vocalist with Michael Franks since 1992.

In the late 1970s she moved to New York City to pursue a degree in theology at Lehmans College in the Bronx. Singing in the music clubs at night to support her college tuition, she met Big Nick Nicholas, who was a teacher of tenor saxophonist John Coltrane. She became a first-call jazz singer in Harlem and Greenwich Village. In 1997 she married jazz pianist Travis Shook and  they started Dead Horse Records in Woodstock, New York.

Selected discography
As leader
 American Lullaby (2002)
 Standard Delivery (2007)
 The Art of Michael Franks (2010)

With Michael Franks
 Watching the Snow
 Rendezvous in Rio

With Travis Shook
 Plays Kurt Weill
 Awake

External links
Official site
[ AllMusic]
NPR Piano Jazz

American women singers
American jazz singers
Musicians from Little Rock, Arkansas
Living people
1957 births
Singers from New York City
Singers from Arkansas
Jazz musicians from New York (state)
Jazz musicians from Arkansas
21st-century American women